Euphaedra luteofasciata is a butterfly in the family Nymphalidae. It is found in Cameroon, Gabon and the Democratic Republic of the Congo (Mayumbe).

References

Butterflies described in 1979
luteofasciata